Xenostigme is a genus of fungi within the Meliolaceae family.

References

External links

Meliolaceae